Andrija Jamometić or Andrea Zamometić (1420–1484) was 15th-century Dominican who struggled for the reformation of the Catholic church through means of conciliarism. Born in the Croatian noble Jamomet family, he tried to achieve church reform through revival of the Council of Basel. His goals included struggling for uniting all European peoples against the advancing Ottomans.

Jamometić graduated at the Padua University. In the 1476–84 period Jamometić was titular Archbishop of the diocese in Krajina (near Skadar lake).

References

Sources 
 
 
 

1420 births
1484 deaths
15th-century Roman Catholic bishops in Croatia
Croatian Dominicans
Members of the Dominican Order
University of Padua alumni